María Odulio de Guzmán (born 1895) was a Filipino teacher, educator, principal, writer, and author. 

She was the first Filipino female principal of a secondary school in the Philippines. She worked as a teacher at the Nueva Écija High School in the province of Nueva Écija from 1918 to 1928. 

She graduated in 1930 from Radford State Teachers' College (now Radford University), located in Radford, Virginia, United States. She was a professor at the Philippine Normal College.

She was a compiler and author of several multilingual dictionaries in Filipino, Spanish, and English. She was also a translator of José Rizal's Noli Me Tangere and a co-translator of El filibusterismo, another novel by Rizal.

Works
Among the dictionaries M.O. de Guzman authored include:
English-Tagalog-Spanish and Tagalog-English Vocabulary, (with co-author Domingo de Guzman, Quezon City, Pressman, 1963, 228 pages)
An English-Tagalog and Tagalog-English Dictionary (1966)
New Tagalog-English English-Tagalog (1966)
New English-Filipino Filipino-English Dictionary (1968)
English-Tagalog and Tagalog-English Dictionary (1966)
New English-Tagalog and Tagalog-English Dictionary (1968)
The New Filipino-English/English-Filipino Dictionary (January 1, 1968)
Bagong Diksiyonaryo: Pilipino-Ingles, Ingles-Pilipino (1968)
Diksiyunaryo Pilipino-Ingles Pilipino (Pilipino-English-Pilipino Dictionary) (1970)
An English-Tagalog and Tagalog-English Dictionary (1979)
English-Tagalog and Tagalog-English Dictionary (1982)
An English-Tagalog and Tagalog-English Dictionary (January 1, 1988)
English-Tagalog and Tagalog-English Dictionary (January 1, 1993)
English-Tagalog and Tagalog-English (2000)
New Tagalog-English Dictionary (2006)
Bagong Talatinigan: Pilipino-Ingles Ingles-Pilipino 

Translated works / Mga Akdang Isinalin
El filibusterismo ni Dr. Jose Rizal
''Noli Me Tangere ni Dr. Jose Rizal

References

Living people
Filipino writers
Filipino educators
Filipino women writers
Filipino non-fiction writers
English-language writers from the Philippines
Tagalog-language writers
Filipino translators
Filipino language
Linguists from the Philippines
Tagalog language
Women lexicographers
Year of birth missing (living people)
Writers from Nueva Ecija
20th-century Filipino educators
20th-century Filipino writers
20th-century women writers